Timothy Carhart (born December 24, 1953) is an American actor. He starred in the CBS drama Island Son (1989–90) and has had recurring roles in CSI: Crime Scene Investigation (2000–03) and 24 (2002). He also starred in the 1992 Broadway revival of A Streetcar Named Desire. His film appearances include Ghostbusters (1984), Pink Cadillac (1989), Thelma & Louise (1991), and Beverly Hills Cop III (1994).

Early life
Carhart was born Timothy Grunig in Washington, D.C. and attended junior high and high school in Evanston, Illinois. He travelled to Izmir and Ankara in Turkey, and to Verdun in France, before returning to the U.S. and studying theater.

Television work 
Carhart made his television acting debut in NBC's 1978 mini-series The Awakening Land. Throughout the 1980s, Carhart made guest appearances on several television series, including Alfred Hitchcock Presents, Miami Vice and Crime Story. Carhart also appeared in two episodes of the crime drama Spenser: For Hire. He played Richard in the Tales from the Darkside episode (2/10) "Ursu Minor" (1985).

In 1989, Carhart had a recurring role on the drama series Thirtysomething and was a regular on the CBS medical drama series Island Son.

Carhart has made guest appearances on a number of science fiction shows including in 1991 where he appeared in Quantum Leap, the time travel series starring Scott Bakula and Dean Stockwell. Later that year he appeared as Lieutenant Commander Christopher Hobson in the fifth-season premiere of Star Trek: The Next Generation, "Redemption (Part 2)". In 1995, Carhart was a guest star on the widely popular science fiction series The X-Files, appearing as Virgil Incanto in the episode "2Shy".

Other television shows on which Carhart guest-starred during the 1990s include Midnight Caller, Empty Nest, Roseanne, The Young Riders, L.A. Law, Law & Order, Strange World and Profiler.

Carhart appeared in several made-for-TV movies during the 1990s, including Call Me Anna (1990), Quicksand: No Escape (1992) Smoke Jumpers (1996), America's Dream (1996) and Before Carhart Wakes (1998). Carhart also starred in two mini-series from CBS, In a Child's Name (1991) and Gone in the Night (1996).

Between 2000 and 2003, Carhart played the recurring role of Eddie Willows on the hit CBS crime drama CSI: Crime Scene Investigation in four episodes. In 2002, he had a recurring role on the hit Fox series 24, playing Assistant NSA head Eric Rayburn in four episodes.

Carhart has also made guest appearances on shows such as The Practice, UPN's The Twilight Zone, Frasier, Judging Amy, Standoff and a 2007 episode of Law & Order: Criminal Intent entitled "Silencer".

He also made a guest appearance on Criminal Minds in the season 4 episode, "Roadkill", as Detective Quinn who calls for the BAU to help investigate after a series of homicides occur that appear to have been caused by a serial killer's car near Bend, Oregon.

Film work 
Two of Carhart's earliest film credits were the 1984 blockbuster horror comedy Ghostbusters and the independent comedy The Party Animal.

In 1985, Carhart had a supporting role in the Academy Award-winning drama Witness and the popular romantic comedy film Desperately Seeking Susan. In the former, he played a supporting role as an undercover narcotics officer whose brutal murder sets the story in motion. Also in 1985, he appeared in the drama film Marie.

In 1986, Carhart appeared in three films: Sweet Liberty, The Manhattan Project and Playing for Keeps.

He played the second male lead in the adventure drama The Rescue (1988) and the action comedy Pink Cadillac (1989). In addition, Carhart can be seen in the hit 1988 comedy film Working Girl.

He appeared in such films as Thelma & Louise (1991), Red Rock West (1992) The Hunt for Red October, Beverly Hills Cop III (1994), Candyman: Farewell to the Flesh (1995), Black Sheep (1996), and Air Force One (1997).

Carhart's most recent film was the 2005 direct-to-DVD Steven Seagal film Black Dawn.

Stage work 
In 1987, Carhart starred in a stage production of Don DeLillo's play The Day Room at the New York City Center. For his performance in this production, he was nominated for the 1988 Drama Desk Award for Outstanding Ensemble Acting.

On Broadway, Carhart played Harold "Mitch" Mitchell in the 1992 revival of Tennessee Williams' A Streetcar Named Desire.

Filmography

Film

Television

Theatre

Music Videos

References

External links 

 
 

1953 births
Male actors from Washington, D.C.
American male film actors
American male television actors
Living people
20th-century American male actors
21st-century American male actors